Sarah Louise Hardaker (born 1 December 1975) is a former English professional badminton player. She has been capped 31 times for England. Hardaker who came from Kent and attended Gravesend Grammar School for Girls between 1987 and 1994, won the mixed doubles title at the English national junior championships in 1992/93 season partnered with Lee Boosey, and also the girls' doubles event in 1993/94 season partnered with Rebecca Pantaney.  She and Boosey were the bronze medallists at the 1993 European Junior Championships in Sofia, Bulgaria. Hardaker competed at the World Championships in three consecutive years in 1997 Glasgow, 1999 Copenhagen, and 2001 Seville. She represented Great Britain at the 2000 Summer Olympics in Sydney, Australia. Hardaker completing her undergraduate degree in sport science, and work at the Nuffield physiotherapist. Before joining Nuffield, she used to work for the National Health Service at Barnet & Chase hospital whilst also being the club physio for Tabard RFC in Herts.

Achievements

European Junior Championships 
Mixed doubles

IBF World Grand Prix
The World Badminton Grand Prix sanctioned by International Badminton Federation (IBF) since 1983.

Women's doubles

IBF International
Women's singles

Women's doubles

Mixed doubles

References

External links
 
 

1975 births
Living people
People educated at Mayfield Grammar School
Sportspeople from Dartford
English female badminton players
Olympic badminton players of Great Britain
Badminton players at the 2000 Summer Olympics
British physiotherapists